The sixth and final season of Top Gear began airing on History from April 26, 2016 until June 28, 2016. Adam Ferrera, Tanner Foust, Rutledge Wood and The Stig returned as hosts, with ten weekly episodes being broadcast.

Production
Season 6 began filming in late 2015 until early 2016 before it eventually aired on the April 26, 2016.
On June 28, 2016, the BBC confirmed that the series had completed its contractual run on the History channel."

Episodes

References

External links
 Season 6 at the Internet Movie Database

Top Gear seasons
2016 American television seasons
2016 in American television